Crepidula porcellana, common name the slipper limpet, is a species of sea snail, a marine gastropod mollusk in the family Calyptraeidae, the slipper snails or slipper limpets, cup-and-saucer snails, and Chinese hat snails.

Description

Distribution

References

External links
 

Calyptraeidae
Gastropods described in 1758
Taxa named by Carl Linnaeus